Rosa María Ortiz Ríos (9 September 1955 – 20 September 2020) was a Peruvian lawyer and politician who served as Minister of Energy and Mines under President Ollanta Humala in 2015/16.

Life
She graduated from the Pontifical Catholic University of Peru (PUCP), an expert in areas of Administrative, Civil, Commercial, Fishing, Corporate, Maritime and Hydrocarbon Law, in national and multinational companies. 

From 2012 to 2016 she was an elected Commissioner on the Inter-American Commission on Human Rights.

References

1950s births
2020 deaths
Peruvian politicians
Inter-American Commission on Human Rights commissioners